Sompob Nilwong (born March 28, 1983), simply known as Aek, is a Thai retired professional footballer who plays as a centre back.

Personal life
Sompob's brother Yai Nilwong is also a footballer and plays for Ratchaburi as a left winger.

International career
In 2012 Sompob was called up to the national team by Winfried Schäfer to the 2014 FIFA World Cup qualification – AFC Third Round.

International

Honours

Club
BEC Tero Sasana
 Thai League Cup (1) : 2014

PT Prachuap FC
 Thai League Cup (1) : 2019

References

External links
 Profile at Goal
https://us.soccerway.com/players/sompob-nilwong/73313/

1983 births
Living people
Sompob Nilwong
Sompob Nilwong
Association football central defenders
Sompob Nilwong
Sompob Nilwong
Sompob Nilwong
Sompob Nilwong
Sompob Nilwong
Sompob Nilwong
Sompob Nilwong